Lake Forest is an unincorporated community in Placer County, California. It lies at an elevation of 6260 feet (1908 m).

The Lake Forest post office operated from 1947 to 1951.

References

Unincorporated communities in California
Unincorporated communities in Placer County, California